Weather Clear, Track Fast is an album by Bobby Previte released on the Enja label in 1991.

Reception

The Allmusic site awarded the album 4½ stars stating "This is easily one of the most important modern jazz outings of the decade. ...One of the reasons why this recording is so successful resides within Previte's memorably melodic compositions and near flawless arrangements. All of this is enhanced by the horn section's imaginative implications, whereby a simple chorus of extended notes might serve as a signal or time stamp amid the oscillating flows and overall sense of movement". Entertainment Weekly's Joseph Woodard said "Previte has shown a talent for creating evocative, almost picturesque music; on his new record, Weather Clear, Track Fast, he extends this approach while opening things up for freer improvisation".

Track listing
All compositions by Bobby Previte.
 "Quinella" - 9:05
 "Weather Clear, Track Fast" - 5:34
 "Traffic Along the Rail" - 11:43
 "3/4 Pole" - 6:45
 "Backstretch" - 7:23
 "Photo Finish" - 7:18
 "Weather Cloudy, Track Slow" - 7:12

Personnel
Bobby Previte – drums
Graham Haynes - cornet
Robin Eubanks - trombone
Don Byron - clarinet, baritone saxophone
Marty Ehrlich - clarinet, bass clarinet, alto saxophone, flute
Anthony Davis (tracks 2-7), Steve Gaboury (track 1) - piano
Anthony Cox - bass

References 

Bobby Previte albums
Enja Records albums
1991 albums